PB-5 Loralai is a constituency of the Provincial Assembly of Balochistan in Pakistan.

General elections 2013

General elections 2008

See also

 PB-4 Musakhel-cum-Barkhan
 PB-6 Duki

References

External links
 Election commission Pakistan's official website
 Awazoday.com check result
 Balochistan's Assembly official site

Constituencies of Balochistan